Dusheti is a municipality of Georgia, in the region of Mtskheta-Mtianeti. It has a population of  25,659 and an area of 2,981.5 km2.
Municipality main town is Dusheti.

Settlements

Geography  
Dusheti Municipality borders with the Kazbegi Municipality in the northwest, the Tianeti Municipality in the east and the Mtskheta Municipality in the south, all in the same Mtskheta-Mtianeti region. In the northeast Dusheti Municipality borders with the Akhmeta Municipality in the Kakheti region, in the southwest with the Kaspi Municipality and in the west de jure with the Akhalgori Municipality (on the territory of the de facto independent, South Ossetia, known there as Leningor District), is located in the Shida Kartli (Inner Kartli) region. In the north, the municipality is bordered by the state border with Russia, with the Ingushetia in the western part and the Chechnya in the east.

Politics 
Dusheti Municipal Assembly (Georgian: დუშეთის საკრებულო) is a representative body in Dusheti Municipality. currently consisting of 33 members. The council assembles into session regularly to consider subject matters such as code changes, utilities, taxes, city budget, city government oversight, and more. Dusheti sakrebulo is elected every four years. The last election was held in October 2021.

See also 
 municipalities of Georgia
 Administrative divisions of Georgia

External links 
 Districts of Georgia, Statoids.com

References 

Municipalities of Mtskheta-Mtianeti